Deming is an unincorporated community in Jackson Township, Hamilton County, Indiana.

History
Deming was laid out in 1837. The first post office in the community was called Penfield. It was renamed Deming in 1854, and was discontinued in 1902.

Geography

References

Unincorporated communities in Hamilton County, Indiana
Unincorporated communities in Indiana
Indianapolis metropolitan area